The 2000 German Figure Skating Championships took place on January 7–9, 2000 in Berlin. Skaters competed in the disciplines of men's singles, ladies' singles, pair skating, ice dancing, and synchronized skating.

Results

Men

Ladies

Pairs

Ice dancing

Synchronized

External links
 2000 German Figure Skating Championships results

German Figure Skating Championships, 2000
German Figure Skating Championships